Wojciech Tomasiewicz (born 18 June 1969) is a retired Polish football goalkeeper.

References

1969 births
Living people
Polish footballers
OKS Stomil Olsztyn players
Pogoń Szczecin players
Energetyk Gryfino players
FSV Wacker 90 Nordhausen players
Arkonia Szczecin players
Association football goalkeepers
Polish expatriate footballers
Expatriate soccer players in the United States
Polish expatriate sportspeople in the United States
Expatriate footballers in Germany
Polish expatriate sportspeople in Germany